"Tu No Eres Para Mi"  is a Latin pop song by Colombian recording artist Fanny Lu. It is the first single from her second studio album Dos, released December 8, 2008. The song's music video became available on Fanny Lu's VEVO on June 16, 2009.

Song information
The song was written and produced by Fanny Lu, José Gaviria and Andrés Munera. It includes guitar and accordion solos. The lyrics describe a failing romantic relationship, in which the singer describes how she previously loved her man, but he was dishonest with her. As a result, she decides to break him up, admitting that they are not for each other.

Music video
The video shows scenes of Fanny Lu with some friends using vodun to curse the man that hurt her. Throughout the video, the man is seen with a bouquet of flowers, watching and trying to talk with the women that he finds, but the women won't allow him to. In the end of the video, he knocks on her door with the ruined bouquet in his hand, trying to reconcile with her, but she closes the door on him. The music video premiered on YouTube on December 10, 2008.

Track listing
Digital remix EP
"Tu No Eres Para Mi" (Album version) — 3:28
"Tu No Eres Para Mi" (Video version) — 3:40
"Tu No Eres Para Mi" (Babyfunk remix) — 4:58
"Tu No Eres Para Mi" (Angel & Khriz mashup) — 3:27
"Tu No Eres Para Mi" (George Figares Remix) — 3:45

Personnel
Fanny Lu – lead vocals, producer, audio production
Andrés Múnera – producer, guitar, audio recording, recording
José Gaviria – producer, audio production, background vocals
John Lozano – accordion, background vocals
Lee Levin – drums
Javier Olivencia – saxophone
Catalina Rodríguez – background vocals

Charts

Weekly charts

Year-end charts

See also
List of number-one Billboard Hot Latin Songs of 2009
List of number-one Billboard Hot Latin Pop Airplay of 2009

References

2008 singles
Spanish-language songs
Fanny Lu songs
Universal Music Latino singles
2008 songs
Songs written by José Gaviria
Songs written by Fanny Lu
Songs written by Andrés Munera